Huff is an unincorporated community in Franklin County, in the U.S. state of Missouri.

History
A post office called Huff was established in 1900, and remained in operation until 1909. The community most likely was named after Andrew Huff, an early settler.

References

Unincorporated communities in Franklin County, Missouri
Unincorporated communities in Missouri